The 2018 Sopot Open was a professional tennis tournament played on clay courts. It was the 1st edition of the tournament which was part of the 2018 ATP Challenger Tour. It was moved from Sopot, Poland to Gdynia due to a problem with the facilities in Sopot. The tournament was played between 30 July and 5 August 2018.

Singles main-draw entrants

Seeds

 1 Rankings are as of 23 July 2018.

Other entrants
The following players received wildcards into the singles main draw:
  Paweł Ciaś
  Michał Dembek
  Wojciech Marek
  Daniel Michalski

The following players received entry from the qualifying draw:
  Maxime Janvier
  Dimitar Kuzmanov
  Vladyslav Manafov
  Roberto Marcora

The following player received entry as a lucky loser:
  Artem Smirnov

Champions

Singles

  Paolo Lorenzi def.  Daniel Gimeno Traver 7–6(7–2), 6–7(5–7), 6–3.

Doubles

  Mateusz Kowalczyk /  Szymon Walków def.  Ruben Gonzales /  Nathaniel Lammons 7–6(8–6), 6–3.

References

External links
Official Website

2018 ATP Challenger Tour
2018 in Polish tennis